The Kota Kemuning Lakeside Park (Malay: Taman Tasik Kota Kemuning) is an urban park in Kota Kemuning, Shah Alam. The park has been designed to provide greenery to Kota Kemuning and the areas surrounding it.

Park Features
The park features a 22 Acre lake surrounded by 25 Acres of land.

A children's playground is also located in the park which is covered with EPDM, a special rubberised material for comfort and safety.

The park also features a 2km jogging track.

Reference

Klang District
Parks in Malaysia